Cardiff Bay Retail Park is a retail park in Grangetown, Cardiff. Built in 1997 on the former Ferry Road landfill site. It is currently home to businesses including; Asda, Boots and Argos.

Development
The retail park is built on the edge of a former Ferry Road refuse site, which closed in 1994 after being filled with 4 million cubic metres of commercial and domestic rubbish. The ownership of the land passed to Cardiff Bay Development Corporation who created the retail park on an area of industrial units to the east of the site. Grangemoor Park was created opposite the retail park on the 20 metre hill landscaped on the old refuse site.

Units

Phase One

Maples was a homeware store that closed in around 2000. Over the years, the unit has been split into 3 smaller units.

Furnitureland and Powerhouse both closed their units in 2007. BHS then refurbished both to create one large unit until they ceased trading in 2016.

JJB closed their unit here once they moved to the Capital Retail Park in Leckwith, which also included a gym.

Phase Two

Phase Three (Dunleavy Drive) 
The Dunleavy Drive section of the Cardiff Bay Retail Park was built in 2008.

Other stores in the surrounding area include Aldi to the south (part of the Cardiff International Sports Village) and IKEA immediately to the north.

References

Shopping in Cardiff
Retail parks in Wales
Grangetown, Cardiff